Tomson v. Ward 1 N.H. 9 (1816) was the first New Hampshire Supreme Court decision recorded in the official New Hampshire reports.

Ruling
In the case the New Hampshire Supreme Court ruled that "[a]n unrecorded deed of lands voluntarily given up, and cancelled by the parties to it, with intent to revest the estate in the grantor, as between them and as to all subsequent claimants under them, operates as a reconveyance, and revests the estate in the grantor."

References

New Hampshire state case law
Property law in the United States
1816 in United States case law
1816 in New Hampshire
Law articles needing an infobox